The Soldier on the Wall is the final album recorded by Alex Harvey. The album was recorded in January 1982 and released shortly after Harvey's death.

Track listing 

 "Mitzi"
 "Billy Bolero"
 "Snowshoes Thompson"
 "Roman Wall Blues"
 "The Poet and I"
 "Nervous"
 "Carry The Water"
 "Flowers Mr. Florist"
 "The Poet and I (Reprise)"

Personnel 

 Alex Harvey - lead vocals, producer
 Tony Lambert - keyboards
 George Hall - keyboards
 Ian "Toose" Taylor - guitar
 Jack Dawe - bass guitar
 Colin Griffin - drums
 Andy Nolan - percussion
 Gordon Sellers - bass on "The Poet and I"
 Tommy Eyre - keyboards on "The Poet and I"
 Ray Conn - harmony - writer - producer - on "The Poet and I"

Additional Personnel 

 Kevin D. Nixon - Producer
 Paul "Chas" Watkins - Engineer
 Roy Neave - Mix engineer
 Viv Ratcliffe - Front cover
 Charles Daykin - Artwork

2003 reissue 

In 2003, the album was given a compact disc release, with only the first four tracks being remastered from their original master tapes. The project was almost abandoned because the second master tape for the other five tracks (the B side of the vinyl album) couldn't be traced. Production staff managed to obtain a good quality copy of the original 1982 vinyl on loan. They digitised and "cleaned up" (as best they could with the technology available at the time) the remaining five tracks, and released them. Consequently, this led to slight surface noise appearing on those tracks; it is most noticeable with some light crackle on the quiet piano introduction to track 5, "The Poet and I".

The CD version has a different cover to the original and liner notes by Harvey's widow, Trudy.

References

1982 albums
Alex Harvey (musician) albums
Albums published posthumously